Speleoperipatus is a monospecific genus of velvet worm in the Peripatidae family, containing the single species Speleoperipatus spelaeus. This species is a pale greenish yellow, almost white, with 22 or 23 pairs of legs and no eyes. Specimens range from 27 mm to 34 mm in length. The minimum number of leg pairs found in this species (22) is also the minimum number found in the neotropical Peripatidae. This velvet worm is viviparous, with mothers supplying nourishment to their embryos through a placenta.

Distribution and habitat 
Speleoperipatus spelaeus is a troglobiont known only from two cave systems in northern St. Catherine, Jamaica; Pedro Cave and Swansea Cave.

One other troglobitic velvet worm species is known; Peripatopsis alba, from Wynberg Cave and Bats Cave, on Table Mountain, South Africa.

Conservation 

Only seven individuals have been found as of 2021; four specimens collected by Dr. Stewart Peck in 1975 at Pedro Cave, one individual found (not collected, but confirmed photographically by Peck) at Swansea Cave by members of the Jamaican Cave Organisation (JCO) in 2010, and two more found again at Swansea Cave by the JCO in November, 2021. The species is listed as Critically Endangered on the IUCN Red List.

References 

Blind onychophorans
Critically endangered fauna of North America
Endemic fauna of Jamaica
IUCN-assessed onychophorans
Monotypic protostome genera
Onychophorans of tropical America
Onychophoran genera
Taxonomy articles created by Polbot
Troglobitic onychophorans